Mark Philip Schultz (born October 26, 1960) is a former American freestyle wrestler. Schultz was a 3-time NCAA champion, Olympic champion and 2-time World champion. In 1995, Schultz was inducted into the National Wrestling Hall of Fame as a Distinguished Member. He is also in the San Jose Sports Hall of Fame, the California Wrestling Hall of Fame, and the San Mateo Peninsula Sports Hall of Fame.

He and his late older brother, wrestler Dave Schultz, both won gold medals in wrestling in the same Olympics (1984). They are the only American brothers to win both World and Olympic gold, and have won more NCAA, U.S. Open, World, and Olympic titles than any other American brother combination in history.

Early life
Mark Schultz was born in 1960 in Palo Alto, California to Dorothy Jean St. Germain (née Rich) and Philip Gary Schultz. He was their second son; first-born Dave  Schultz was 17 months older. They had two half-siblings, Michael and Seana. Schultz is of half Belarusian-Jewish and half British/Irish/French/German descent. His paternal grandparents were Estelle (Bernstein), the daughter of a prominent paper company executive, and Maxwell L. Schultz, a business consultant. His maternal grandparents were Dorothy (Starks), a radiologist who graduated from Stanford Medical School #1 in her class, and Willis Rich, a Stanford ichthyology professor, inventor of the salmon ladder and discoverer of the "home stream theory" that salmon return to the rivers where they were born in order to spawn before they die. The boys attended local schools. Schultz got interested in gymnastics and started competing.

Athletic career

High school career
Mark Schultz attended Palo Alto High, where he was coached by Ed Hart. Mark competed first in gymnastics, winning the Northern California All-Around Gymnastics Championships in the 15-16 year old age group. During his junior year in high school, he moved to Ashland, Oregon and switched to Tang Soo Do at Bob Barrow Karate. After he got in a fight with his brother Dave, he  quit Tang Soo Do and tried out for the Ashland High School wrestling team at 130 lbs. After one semester at Ashland he transferred back to Palo Alto, but was declared ineligible, ending his junior year with a 4–6 record. Over the summer of 1977 Mark grew several inches and gained 30 lbs. The Palo Alto High wrestling coach was also Mark's gymnastics coach Ed Hart. Mark started for Palo Alto High at 154 lb (+ 5 lbs at the CA State Championships=159 lbs). Coach Hart scheduled three 16-team tournaments during the regular season. During Mark's senior year he broke his big toe and couldn't compete in the 1st tournament. At the next tournament at Alisal High School Mark lost his first match and was eliminated. At the Monta Vista Invitational Mark took 3rd. At the end of the season Mark won the Santa Clara Valley Athletic League (9 schools), the Region (20 schools), the Central Coast Section (90 schools). At CCS Mark defeated Joe Guillory from James Lick High who was the defending CCS champion. Mark was named CCS Outstanding Wrestler. At the 1978 California State Championships (900 schools) Mark defeated 3 undefeated wrestlers to win state. Mark was named Palo Alto High School "Athlete of the Year" in 1978. Mark's high school record was 34-8. He is also the only California High School State Champion in history never to win a tournament prior to the state qualifiers. In contrast, Mark's brother Dave Schultz had the greatest high school senior year in U.S. history. The National Wrestling Hall of Fame gives out an award each year to the best wrestler from every state and one for the entire country called the "Dave Schultz High School Excellence Award." Many people attribute Mark's rapid improvement at the end of his senior year to training with his brother Dave, but Mark never trained with Dave until the summer after Mark's senior year. The Schultz brothers won more NCAA, World, and Olympic titles than any brother combination in U.S. history.

Collegiate career
Schultz was voted by his peers "College Wrestler of the decade" in the book "The Golden Era of Amateur Wrestling: 1980's" by Reginald Rowe. Schultz attended UCLA and went 18-8 at 150 & 158 lbs his freshman year. He transferred to the University of Oklahoma, redshirted, and in the following three years (1981–83) won three NCAA Championships. Schultz was the NCAA Champion his sophomore year at 167 lbs. His junior year Schultz moved up to 177 lbs where he faced two-time NCAA Champion (1980, 1981) Ed Banach. Former NCAA Champion (at 167 lbs in 1980) Matt Reiss also moved up to 177 lbs and placed 8th. Banach was on track to become the first 4-time NCAA champion in history; however, Schultz beat Banach 16-8 in "one of, if not the best, NCAA finals match of all time" and was named Outstanding Wrestler for the tournament. In 1983 Mark Schultz set the University of Oklahoma record for most victories (27) in an undefeated season and was named Oklahoma Student-Athlete of the year.

Olympics and World championships
In 1984, Mark and Dave Schultz both won Olympic Gold in wrestling events, as did the American twin Banach brothers. The following year, Mark won the World Championships and faced competitors from all the Eastern bloc countries who had boycotted the 1984 Olympics. In the World finals, Mark built a 10-2 lead after one minute and won 10-5. Mark Schultz is the only 1984 Olympic Champion to win the 1985 World Championships; his brother Dave was the only 1984 Olympic Champion to have won the 1983 World Championships. When Schultz won another World Championship in 1987, he became the first Olympic Champion to win two additional World titles; he tied Lee Kemp's U.S. record for World golds. In 1991, Mark Schultz, Lee Kemp, and John Smith were in the Guinness Book of World Records as "Most World or Olympic titles by a U.S. wrestler."

Before the 1988 Olympics, Mark was working as an Assistant Coach at Villanova University and competing for multi-millionaire John E. du Pont's wrestling club, Team Foxcatcher. In 1987, du Pont threatened Mark by saying "I'm going to ruin your career" in a locker room, in front of wrestler Dan Chaid. Mark decided to quit Team Foxcatcher after the 1988 Olympics.

At the Olympic Trials Mark made the 1988 Olympic Team in the most dominating performance of his life, defeating 2-time NCAA Wrestling Champion and NCAA Outstanding Wrestler Mike Sheets 13-1. During the Olympics, it occurred to Mark it would be immoral to give John du Pont the prestige and status of "producing" an Olympic champion, so Mark threw his match to his opponent from Turkey, losing 14-0. Mark never wrestled again.

Coaching and mixed martial arts
After eight years in retirement from wrestling competition, Schultz became the first Olympic gold medalist to enter the Ultimate Fighting Championship (UFC). With one day's notice Schultz replaced Dave Beneteau at UFC 9 in 1996, facing off against the UFC 8 runner-up, Canadian Gary Goodridge. He won the bout by doctor stoppage due to a cut. Schultz was paid $50,000 for his victory. Schultz is ranked by bloodyelbow.com as the greatest wrestler in UFC history. At the time, he was a Head Coach of wrestling at Brigham Young University.

Coaching and competition
Schultz was the assistant wrestling coach at Brigham Young University from 1991 to 1994, then he was named Head Coach.  In 1993, Schultz had his first brazilian jiu-jitsu experience in a match with Rickson Gracie. At the time, only two non-Gracie family members were Gracie Jiu-Jitsu black belts. One was Pedro Sauer who coached Mark for 3 years prior to UFC 9. Mark defeated Gary Goodridge at UFC 9.  Mark was awarded a Brazilian Jiu-Jitsu black belt by Sauer.

Personal life
He married Kristy Aileen Thompson in 1990 and divorced in 2002. They have three children, Mark David, Kelli, and Sarah.

On January 26, 1996, Mark's brother Dave, who had worked as a coach for the "Team Foxcatcher" for multimillionaire philanthropist John du Pont, was shot and killed by du Pont, who had been displaying increasingly odd behavior in the months before the murder. Four months after Dave's murder, Mark competed in and won an early mixed martial arts event at UFC 9. Mark Schultz joined the Church of Jesus Christ of Latter-day Saints in 1991. He has since left the LDS Church, as he cannot reconcile the claims of Joseph Smith with his understanding of faith.

In media
 Foxcatcher (2014) is a feature film written by E. Maxe Frye and Dan Futterman, directed by Bennett Miller, and starring Steve Carell as du Pont, Channing Tatum as Mark, and Mark Ruffalo as Dave Schultz.
 Mark Schultz wrote a New York Times best-selling memoir, Foxcatcher: The True Story of My Brother's Murder, John du Pont's Madness, and the Quest for Olympic Gold (2014) published the same year as the film was released.
 In 2015, director Jesse Vile produced the ESPN 30 for 30 documentary The Prince of Pennsylvania starring Mark Schultz, Rob Calabrese, Dan Chaid, Taras Wochuk, Tony DeHaven, and du Pont's wife Gale Wenk. It tells the true story of Team Foxcatcher and the murder of Dave Schultz.
 In The Golden Era of Amateur Wrestling: 1980's by Reginald Rowe, Schultz was voted by his peers as the greatest collegiate wrestler of the 1980s. Ed Banach, Mark's opponent in the 1982 NCAA finals, was ranked 2nd greatest collegiate wrestler of the 1980s. Ed Banach is a 3-time NCAA Champion and an Olympic Champion. Banach is considered one of the most conditioned athletes of all time.

Athletic titles
 1976 Northern California Age Group (15-16) All-around Gymnastics Champion
 1978 California High School State Wrestling Champion
 1981, 1982, 1983 NCAA Champion
 1982 Voted NCAA "Outstanding Wrestler"
 1982 World Cup Champion
 1982 Nominated for Oklahoma "Headliner of the Year Award" but lost to Oklahoma State football star Barry Sanders. 
 1982-1983 won the last 44 matches of his college career.
 1983 Set the University of Oklahoma record for most victories in a single season without a loss
 1984 Olympic Champion
 1985, 1987 World Champion
 1985 Wrestling Masters Magazine "International Wrestler of the Year"
 1984, 1985, 1986, 1987 National Open Freestyle Champion
 1983, 1985, 1987 National Sports Festival Champion
 1987 Pan American Games Champion
 1987 USA Wrestling Athlete of the Year
 1987 Sullivan Award Nominee
 1987 Olympian Magazine Sportsman of the Year
 1995 Inducted into the National Wrestling Hall of Fame
 1996 Won the Ultimate Fighting Championships IX. Retired with a 1-0 No-holds-barred record.
 2000 Inducted into the California Wrestling Hall of Fame.
 2010 Inducted into the San Jose Sports Hall of Fame.
 2013 Awarded the Lifetime Service Award by the California Chapter of the National Wrestling Hall of Fame.
 2015 Inducted into the San Mateo Peninsula Sports Hall of Fame.
 2015 Mark's autobiography "Foxcatcher" is turned into a 5-time Oscar nominated motion picture. Foxcatcher becomes a New York Times best-seller
 2016 In "The Golden Era of Amateur Wrestling: 1980's" by Reginald Rowe, Schultz was voted by his peers as the greatest collegiate wrestler of the 1980s.
 2020 Mark's autobiography "Foxcatcher" becomes an Amazon "Editor's Pick."

Mixed martial arts record

.

| Win
| align=center | 1–0
| Gary Goodridge
| TKO (cut)
| UFC 9
| 
| align=center | 1
| align=center | 12:00
| Detroit, Michigan, United States
|

See also
List of Jews in sports

References

External links

 
 
 

1960 births
Living people
American male sport wrestlers
American male mixed martial artists
Mixed martial artists utilizing collegiate wrestling
Mixed martial artists utilizing freestyle wrestling
American people of British descent
American people of Ukrainian-Jewish descent
American wrestling coaches
BYU Cougars wrestling coaches
College wrestling coaches in the United States
Medalists at the 1984 Summer Olympics
Olympic gold medalists for the United States in wrestling
Oklahoma Sooners wrestlers
Palo Alto High School alumni
Pan American Games gold medalists for the United States
Sportspeople from Palo Alto, California
UCLA Bruins wrestlers
Wrestlers at the 1984 Summer Olympics
Wrestlers at the 1988 Summer Olympics
World Wrestling Championships medalists
Pan American Games medalists in wrestling
Wrestlers at the 1987 Pan American Games
Ultimate Fighting Championship male fighters
Medalists at the 1987 Pan American Games